Yemeni civil war may refer to several conflicts which have taken place in Yemen:

Alwaziri coup, February – March 1948
Yemeni–Adenese clan violence, 1956–60
North Yemen Civil War, 1962–70
Aden Emergency, 1963–67
North Yemen-South Yemen Border Conflict of 1972
Yemenite War of 1972
NDF Rebellion, 1978–82
Yemenite War of 1979
South Yemen Civil War, January 13–25, 1986
Yemeni Civil War (1994)
Al-Qaeda insurgency in Yemen, 1998–2014
Houthi insurgency in Yemen, 2004–15
South Yemen insurgency, 2009–15
Yemeni Crisis (2011–present)
Yemeni Revolution, 2011–12
Yemeni civil war (2014–present), ongoing
Saudi Arabian–led intervention in Yemen, March 26, 2015 – ongoing
Lahij insurgency, March 27 – August 4, 2015 
Aden unrest (2015–2019), October 6, 2015 – August 29, 2019
Hadramaut insurgency, April 26, 2016 – April 29, 2018

See also
Insurgency in Yemen (disambiguation)
List of wars involving Yemen
Yemen War (disambiguation)